is a fictional character from Square Enix's franchise Kingdom Hearts, debuting in the original 2002 Kingdom Hearts game. Riku is introduced as a teenager who wishes to visit other worlds with his friends Sora and Kairi. After a way to other worlds is opened, Riku meets the evil fairy Maleficent who pits him against Sora, leading to Riku falling to darkness and ultimately being possessed by Ansem, Seeker of Darkness. Riku is freed thanks to Sora and returns as a protagonist in following games.

Riku was created and designed by Tetsuya Nomura who wanted him to be a foil for Sora's character and wanted his character arc represent the series' main theme of being able to choose light or darkness. His design and story are in parallel to Kingdom Hearts Birth By Sleep character Terra. He is voiced by Mamoru Miyano and Eiji Shima in Japanese, while David Gallagher and Ty Panitz voice him in English.

Critical response to Riku has been generally positive. David Gallagher's performance of Riku was also praised by the media.

Creation and design 
Riku's character represents one of the series' main themes, "the light and the dark sides of hearts," alongside Sora.

In Kingdom Hearts II, Riku's Keyblade is Way to the Dawn, which Nomura designed to look like his previous weapon, the Soul Eater. This name came from a scene at the end of Chain of Memories where Riku said he would walk "the road to dawn." Though Riku has a minor role in Birth by Sleep, Nomura wanted to expand on his connection with Keyblade user Terra who would give him the ability to wield such weapon and upon growing older would meet him again.

On the character's role in Dream Drop Distance, Nomura emphasized Riku as the game's main focus as it shows the character's growth across the series. Despite using two protagonists, the game primarily focuses on Riku's growth across the series. As a result of the game's plot, both Sora and Riku appear in their younger forms from the first Kingdom Hearts game. However, to avoid misconceptions that Dream Drop Distance was a remake of the original game, Nomura decided to change Sora's and Riku's outfits for most of the game. When it comes to Riku's new design, Nomura altered its hair based on fan response following Kingdom Hearts II.

For Kingdom Hearts III, Riku and Kairi's new designs were made to fit with Sora's; for example, Riku's main colour is blue in contrast to Sora's red, while Kairi's main colour remains pink as usual. All of the new costumes, including Mickey's, are given to them by Yen Sid, and because of that they share the gingham pattern. Riku's new Keyblade, Braveheart, was meant to contrast the Way to Dawn Keyblade which is destroyed early in the game.

Casting

Mamoru Miyano voices Riku in Japanese. His child persona is voiced by Eiji Shima. Miyano found extremely rare to be able to do Riku's voice for twenty years. Additionally since he has been doing it since we were teens, Miyano was able to truly see the changes in the cast through the games: "the growth of our bodies, our voices, and our hearts". He was able to perform something right from myself, true to life. By the time he recorded Kingdom Hearts II in his twenties, his sense of "self" as an actor had been formed. Miyano knew what kind of performances he wanted to give—and he found myself unable to really become Riku. So Miyano did so many re-takes. Thanks to that experience, he was able to create his performance in Kingdom Hearts III by prioritizing "becoming Riku" over his own desires.

In English, the character is voiced by David Gallagher. Gallagher said that Riku has a notable sex appeal which would make him famous within the female fans. As a result, he gives the character vocal quality similar to that of a rebellious teenager. As a child the character is voiced by Ty Panitz.

Appearances
Riku is a childhood friend and rival of Sora, who resides with him and Kairi on Destiny Islands. He appears as a non-playable character in the original game, where he is introduced as a 15-year-old boy. During the invasion of Destiny Islands by the Heartless, Riku immerses himself in darkness to discover new worlds beyond his home. Arriving at Hollow Bastion, Riku is manipulated by Maleficent into aiding her plans for world conquest in exchange for knowledge to restore Kairi's missing heart. His signature weapon is the Soul Eater sword, a manifestation of the darkness in his heart. During the first game, Riku is revealed to be the rightful owner of Sora's Keyblade, which was bequeathed onto the five-year-old Riku by Terra during the events of Birth by Sleep; however, his reliance on the power of darkness caused the Keyblade to reject Riku in favor of Sora. He is later tricked into allowing Xehanort's Heartless, Ansem, to possess his body. Following Ansem's defeat, Riku helps Sora and King Mickey close the door to Kingdom Hearts, remaining on the other side with the king.

In Chain of Memories, DiZ helps Riku escape from the dark realm. Initially rejecting his darkness out of guilt, Riku resolves to wield both powers of light and darkness to battle Ansem, whose essence lingers in Riku's heart. A replica of Riku also appears in Chain of Memories, having been created by Vexen from Organization XIII as a pawn.

In Kingdom Hearts II, Riku is forced to harness Ansem's power to defeat Roxas in order to restore Sora's missing memories; Riku assumes Ansem's appearance as a result, only returning to his regular appearance after the explosion of DiZ's heart encoder. Riku acquires another Keyblade, the Way to the Dawn. He and Sora return to Destiny Islands together following Xemnas's defeat.

Riku is also present in the multiplayer mode of 358/2 Days. He also appears in the story mode, contacting Sora's replica Xion, and later as the final boss, where he faces Roxas as seen in Kingdom Hearts II. In Dream Drop Distance, he and Sora undertake the Mark of Mastery exam in preparation for Xehanort's return. Riku is promoted to Keyblade Master after venturing into Sora's dreams as a Dream Eater to protect Sora from Xehanort.

He subsequently embarks with Mickey in Kingdom Hearts III to rescue Aqua from the realm of darkness. Riku is also briefly playable at several points in the Dark World in Kingdom Hearts III and is playable in the Re Mind expansion of Kingdom Hearts III. He obtains a new Keyblade, Braveheart. During a visit to Radiant Garden, Riku analyzes digital copies of Sora and the Organization's members, hoping to uncover clues to Sora's whereabouts. After the analysis proves inconclusive, Riku is approached by the Fairy Godmother to meet Yen Sid, who suspects that they may find Sora through the dreams of Riku and two others. In Melody of Memory, Riku explains his dream of a modern metropolis to a girl called the Nameless Star, who recognizes it as a city called Quadratum in her world, allowing Riku to open a portal to the other reality and begin his search for Sora.

Riku also makes an appearance in Super Smash Bros. Ultimate as a spirit. In a collaboration between Square Enix and Japanese fashion brand SuperGroupies, Riku's image was used to create clothing based on his design from Kingdom Hearts III.

Reception
USGamer praised his role for giving the narrative a major impact as he takes over the role of the Disney villains in Hollow Bastion. The writer praised how strong he becomes as he defeats the Beast and takes over the Keyblade from Sora. Although Riku ends up being defeated, he being used by Ansem was noted to keep giving the narrative a darker tone. Paste Magazine said that a vital part in Riku's characterization in Kingdom Hearts is how he embraces darkness in contrast to Sora especially after meeting Maleficent in a similar fashion to Terra during Birth by Sleep. The inclusion of Riku in Chain of Memories as a playable character was praised by GamesRadar due his enjoyable gameplay. Comic Book Resources listed Sora's and Riku's fight against Xemnas as one of Riku's best action sequences in the entire series. Although Riku and Sora are friends, GamesRadar stated that the several cutscenes they share in the first three games of the franchise often result into attracting the Yaoi fandom to the point Sora's love interest Kairi is removed from such interactions.

Riku's new Keyblade, Braveheart, was commented by Scyfy to be one of the most interesting designs from the entire game, citing parallels with Cloud Strife's derived Keyblade Fenrir from Kingdom Hearts II.

Hardcore Gamer liked in the inclusion of Riku as playable character in the Kingdom Hearts III DLC but lamented his few possible fights. The character's inclusion in the Tokyo Metropolitan Government Building during the Kingdom Hearts III secret ending was the subject of analysis as whether or not Riku might interact again with the cast from The World Ends With You as well as Yozora, an original character resembling him as well as Final Fantasy XV lead Noctis Lucis Caelum.

The performance of David Gallagher as Riku's English actor was praised by GamesRadar and Hardcore Gamer as one of the best performances in Kingdom Hearts 3D and Kingdom Hearts III alongside Sora's and Aqua's English actors. His inclusion as a playable character in 3D was also praised due to his dynamic with fellow lead Sora. Koinya lamented the fact Mamoru Miyano's work was never made available for the Western audience considering him talented alongside Miyu Irino (Sora). In a poll from Famitsu, Riku was voted as the series' fourth best male character. A perfume based on the character was also released.

References

Fictional characters who can manipulate darkness or shadows
Fictional child soldiers
Fictional empaths
Fictional explorers in video games
Fictional knights in video games
Fictional martial artists in video games
Fictional swordfighters in video games
Kingdom Hearts original characters
Video game characters who can move at superhuman speeds
Video game characters introduced in 2002